Emerald Island is an extended play (EP) by Dutch singer Caro Emerald. It was released by Grandmono Records on 6 March 2017 at the start of Emerald’s largest tour to date, the Emerald Island Tour. The EP was produced by David Schreurs and Jan van Wieringen, and written by David Schreurs, Vincent DeGiorgio and Guy Chambers. The EP was inspired by the exotica genre of music, popular in the 50/60's.

Track listing

Release history

References 

2017 EPs
Caro Emerald albums